Fábio "Fabinho" Alexandre Cruz Martins (born 10 February 1996) is a Portuguese footballer who plays as a midfielder for F.C. Alverca.

Football career
On 26 April 2015, Fabinho  made his professional debut with Sporting B in a 2014–15 Segunda Liga match against Oriental.

On 15 April 2018 he signed a short contract, until end of the season, with the Bulgarian First League team Cherno More Varna after a main player got injured. He completed his debut on 20 April 2018 in a league match against Slavia Sofia.

In August 2018, Fabinho signed contract with Estoril until 30 June 2020.

References

External links

Stats and profile at LPFP 

Fabinho Martins at ZeroZero

1996 births
Footballers from Lisbon
Living people
Portuguese footballers
Portuguese expatriate footballers
Association football midfielders
Liga Portugal 2 players
First Professional Football League (Bulgaria) players
Sporting CP B players
PFC Cherno More Varna players
S.C. Covilhã players
G.D. Estoril Praia players
Episkopi F.C. players
F.C. Alverca players
Portuguese expatriate sportspeople in Bulgaria
Portuguese expatriate sportspeople in Greece
Expatriate footballers in Bulgaria
Expatriate footballers in Greece